Castle Lager is a South African pale lager. It is the flagship product of South African Breweries and has been recognised as the National Beer of South Africa , based on the fact that it is 100% grown and produced in the country, and for its ability to unite the community behind a common cause.

History 

Castle Lager's origins can be traced to the Johannesburg gold rush of 1886. Charles Glass, founder of the Castle Brewery, began selling beer to the miners after noticing a gap in the market. The new beer soon became popular amongst the prospectors of the gold rush, and in 1889 one of Johannesburg's early newspapers, The Digger's News, declared it "a phenomenal success." In 1895, on the success of Castle Lager, South African Breweries (SAB) was founded, with its head office being the Castle Brewery. Two years later, SAB became the first industrial company to list on the Johannesburg Stock Exchange. Today, Castle Lager is brewed in nine countries and is available in over 40 countries worldwide. In 2000 Castle Lager was awarded in the "World's Best Bottled Lager" category at the Brewing Industry International Awards.

In 2002, South African Breweries bought Miller, forming SABMiller. In 2016, Anheuser-Busch InBev acquired SABMiller.

Sponsorships
Castle Lager sponsorships include:
Premier Sponsor of the South African Football Team (Bafana Bafana).
Team Sponsor of the South African Cricket Team (Castle Lager Proteas).
Associate Sponsor of the South African Rugby Team (Springboks).
Official beer supplier to the HSBC Sevens World Series Leg: Nelson Mandela Bay, South Africa. 
Official beer supplier to the Vodacom Super Rugby Tournament.
Official beer supplier to the Premier Soccer League (PSL).

Related products

Castle Lite - introduced in 1994, Castle Lite is a reduced alcohol and lower calorie variant of Castle Lager. It is sold in a green bottle (as opposed to Castle Lager's brown) and is also available in cans and draught. Castle Lite is lagered at -2.5 °C and is packaged with South Africa's first thermochromic temperature indicator. It has an alcohol by volume of 4%.
Castle Lite Lime - a Lime flavoured variant of Castle Lite introduced in 2014.
Castle Milk Stout - a milk stout that is advertised as "South Africa's Premier Stout". Castle Milk Stout is the only beer that uses a dark roasted malt to extract a rich brew. The addition of caramel balances out the bitterness in an attempt to offer a more balanced taste. It has an ABV of 6%
Castle Milk Stout Chocolate Infused - a chocolate infused variant of Castle Milk Stout. 
Castle Free - a non-alcoholic beer introduced in 2017 and the first of its type to be produced in South Africa.
Castle Double Malt - a premium quality pure malt lager introduced in 2021, made from two of the best malts sourced from the best malts producing regions, Caledon and Alrode. It is said to have a rich, complex flavour, deep gold colour and creamy foam. It has an alcohol content of 5.5% by volume.

See also

Beer in South Africa
SABMiller brands

References

External links 
 Castle Lager Official Site
 Castle Lite Official Site
 Castle Milk Stout Official Site

Beer in South Africa
SABMiller
Beer in Africa